Bierna  is a village in the administrative district of Gmina Łodygowice, within Żywiec County, Silesian Voivodeship, in southern Poland.

The village has a population of 933.

References

Bierna